Clinton High School may refer to:

 Clinton High School (Arkansas), Clinton, Arkansas
 Clinton High School (Clinton, Illinois)
 Clinton High School (Iowa), Clinton, Iowa
 Clinton County High School, Albany, Kentucky
 Clinton High School,  Clinton, Louisiana
 Clinton High School (Massachusetts), Clinton, Massachusetts
 Clinton-Graceville-Beardsley High School, Graceville, Minnesota
 Clinton High School (Clinton, Mississippi)
 Clinton High School, Clinton School District (Missouri), Clinton, Missouri
 Clinton High School (Clinton, New York)
 DeWitt Clinton High School, Bronx, New York City, New York
 Clinton High School, Clinton, Sampson County, North Carolina
 Clinton-Massie High School, Clarksville, Ohio
 East Clinton High School, Lees Creek, Ohio
 Port Clinton High School, Port Clinton, Ohio
 Clinton High School (Clinton, Oklahoma)
 Clinton High School (South Carolina), Clinton, South Carolina
 Clinton High School (Clinton, Tennessee)
 Clinton High School (Clinton, Wisconsin)

See also
 Clinton School (disambiguation)